Joel Steven Siegel (July 7, 1943 – June 29, 2007) was an American film critic for the ABC morning news show Good Morning America for over 25 years. The winner of multiple Emmy Awards, Siegel also worked as a radio disc jockey and an advertising copywriter.

Early life and education
Born to a Jewish family of Romanian descent, Siegel was raised in Los Angeles. He graduated cum laude from the University of California, Los Angeles. His Romanian-born grandmother from Botoşani survived the Triangle Shirtwaist Factory fire in March 1911. During college, Siegel worked to register black voters in Georgia during the Civil Rights Movement, and he spoke frequently of having met Martin Luther King Jr. He also worked as a joke writer for Senator Robert F. Kennedy and was at the Ambassador Hotel the night the senator was assassinated. According to some reports, he also led student opposition to the construction of a football stadium on campus.

Career

Early work 
Siegel worked at a range of jobs throughout the 1960s, often concentrating on the civil rights movement. In the late '60s, before moving to New York, he worked as an advertising agency copy-writer and producer. While working in advertising for Carson/Roberts Advertising, he invented and named ice cream flavors for Baskin-Robbins. These flavors were: German Chocolate Cake; Peaches & Cream; Pralines & Cream; Blueberry Cheesecake; Strawberry Cheesecake; Green Cheesecake; Red, White and Blueberry; and Chilly Burgers.

He began working in radio as a disc jockey and newscaster, while continuing to freelance in advertising. Through his freelance work, he was offered the book review position with the Los Angeles Times.

Siegel's essays in the Los Angeles Times Sunday Magazine were spotted by a CBS executive, and Siegel was hired as a feature correspondent for WCBS-TV in New York. Joel created signature work teamed with a producer who later became an executive at WABC-TV's Eyewitness News. When Siegel's producer moved, he offered Siegel a featured on-air position, and Joel accepted. Siegel proposed to Eyewitness News management that he become a film and theatre critic. He suggested that he would innovate the form by using brief clips from the movie or show being reviewed as drop-ins into his reviews, working them into his scripts as gags to create a new, witty form of review. Siegel, during his years at WCBS-TV, also created features for WCBS-AM Newsradio 88 called Joel Siegel's New York.

In 1986, Spy magazine derided Siegel as "the poor man's Gene Shalit", who relied "heavily on alliteration."

Good Morning America and later career
In 1981, he joined Good Morning America (GMA) as a film critic. While Siegel worked at his reviewing, he wrote the book for The First, a Broadway musical based on the story of Jackie Robinson, for which he received a Tony Award nomination in 1982. This marks him as the only drama critic to receive this nomination. In 1999, Siegel was also one of the many guest critics on Roger Ebert's show At The Movies as a replacement for Gene Siskel following his death. Siegel was also a good friend of Roger Ebert.

Personal life and death
Siegel's second wife, Jane Kessler, died from a brain tumor in 1982. In 1991, he joined with the actor Gene Wilder to found Gilda's Club, a nonprofit organization that provided social support for cancer patients and their families. The organization was named for Wilder's wife, Gilda Radner, who died of ovarian cancer.

On June 21, 1996, Siegel married his fourth wife, artist Ena Swansea. In 1997, at 53 years, he was diagnosed with colorectal cancer. One week after being diagnosed, Siegel found out he would be a father for the first time. He wrote the book Lessons for Dylan which shares the ups and downs of his life with his young son, as he might not live long enough to relate those stories in person. Siegel underwent surgery, radiation, and chemotherapy. He welcomed his newborn son, Dylan Thomas Jefferson Swansea Siegel, home on the same day he completed his chemotherapy treatments. Two years later, a CAT scan revealed a lesion on Siegel's left lung. After a pulmonary lobectomy and additional chemotherapy, Siegel continued to work on GMA.

He was outspoken on the subject of colon cancer, and in 2005, spoke at a meeting of C-Change, a group of cancer experts from government, business, and nonprofit sectors, chaired by former President George H. W. Bush and former First Lady Barbara Bush. He testified before the Senate during Colorectal Cancer Awareness month, March 2005. "I came here from New York City this morning hoping that I would encourage someone to have a colonoscopy so that they would not have to go through what I went through", he told a Senate panel. In June 2005, Siegel published a letter in the peer-reviewed cancer medicine journal, The Oncologist entitled, "One at a Time". It shares his cancer diagnosis and experiences to that date.

On May 10, 2007, less than two months before his death, he spoke before the CEO Roundtable on Cancer, an association of corporate executives that was formed when former President George H. W. Bush asked corporate America to do something "bold and venturesome" about cancer. Bush and his wife Barbara were in the audience when Joel spoke on May 10 at the Essex House in New York City. He began and ended his presentation by saying, "I want to thank you for what you are doing for cancer patients."

Siegel died from metastatic colon cancer on June 29, 2007 shortly before what would have been his 64th birthday. Following his death, Roger Ebert wrote a tribute to Joel and stated in the tribute that Joel was "a brave man, and a hell of a nice guy."

Awards
Siegel received five New York Emmy Awards and a public service award from the Anti-Defamation League of B'nai B'rith and the New York State Associated Press Broadcasters Association Award for general excellence in individual reporting.

Works
Siegel, Joel. Lessons for Dylan: On Life, Love, the Movies, and Me. PublicAffairs, 2003.

References

External links

Joel Siegel's ABC Website
A memoriam  written by Roger Ebert
Kevin Smith's Response Contains mp3 of Smith's confrontation with Siegel on the Opie and Anthony show on July 18, 2006 following Siegel's harshly negative review of Clerks II.

1943 births
2007 deaths
Jewish American writers
American people of Romanian-Jewish descent
American film critics
American television reporters and correspondents
Deaths from colorectal cancer
Writers from Los Angeles
University of California, Los Angeles alumni
Grammy Award winners
Deaths from cancer in New York (state)
Writers Guild of America Award winners
Jewish American journalists
20th-century American Jews
21st-century American Jews
Alexander Hamilton High School (Los Angeles) alumni